Alex Hall (born August 17, 1985) is a professional Canadian football defensive end who is currently a free agent. He was drafted by the Cleveland Browns in the seventh round of the 2008 NFL Draft. He played college football at St. Augustine's College.

Hall was a member of the Philadelphia Eagles, Arizona Cardinals, New York Giants, and Carolina Panthers in the National Football League and the Winnipeg Blue Bombers and Saskatchewan Roughriders of the CFL.

Professional career

Cleveland Browns
Hall was drafted by the Cleveland Browns in the seventh round of the 2008 NFL Draft with the 231st overall pick. He signed a four-year contract with the team on July 22, 2008.

Philadelphia Eagles
On April 2, 2010, Hall and the 2010 fourth and fifth-round draft picks were traded to the Philadelphia Eagles in exchange for linebacker Chris Gocong and Sheldon Brown. He was waived on July 28, 2010.

New York Giants
Hall was claimed off waivers by the New York Giants on July 29, 2010. He was waived by the Giants on September 4, 2010.

Arizona Cardinals
Hall signed with the Arizona Cardinals on September 21, 2010. He was waived by the team on October 30.

New York Giants (second stint)
Hall was claimed off waivers from the Arizona Cardinals on November 1, 2010 and placed on the active roster, replacing Giants cornerback Bruce Johnson, who was placed on injured reserve. On November 27, Hall was waived to make room for Michael Coe, who was signed to the active roster. While he worked out for the Pittsburgh Steelers on December 14, 2010, he was re-signed on December 15 after linebacker Clint Sintim was placed on injured reserve.

Winnipeg Blue Bombers
Hall signed with the Winnipeg Blue Bombers of the Canadian Football League on April 24, 2012. He ended the season as an East Division All-Star and was named Winnipeg's Most Outstanding Defensive Player.

Saskatchewan Roughriders
On October 6, 2013, Hall was traded (along with a 2nd round pick in the 2014 CFL Draft) to the Saskatchewan Roughriders in exchange for non-import lineman Patrick Neufeld and a 5th round selection in 2015 CFL Draft. At the time of the trade, Hall led the league in sacks with 15, by the end of the season he would be 2nd in the league with 16 sacks. Since Hall's CFL contract expired at the end of the 2013 CFL season it was expected that would try out for an NFL team for the following season. Hall also won the Grey Cup that year.

Carolina Panthers
On April 11, 2014, Hall signed with the Carolina Panthers. The Panthers released Hall on August 24, 2014.

Saskatchewan Roughriders (II)
Hall re-signed with the Roughriders on February 11, 2015.

References

External links
Saskatchewan Roughriders bio 
Carolina Panthers bio

1985 births
Living people
Players of American football from Maryland
People from Prince George's County, Maryland
St. Augustine's Falcons football players
American football defensive ends
American football linebackers
Cleveland Browns players
Philadelphia Eagles players
New York Giants players
Arizona Cardinals players
Winnipeg Blue Bombers players
Saskatchewan Roughriders players
Carolina Panthers players